Sir Brian Caldwell Cook Batsford (18 December 1910 – 5 March 1991) was an English painter, designer, publisher and Conservative Party politician. Born at Gerrards Cross in Buckinghamshire as Brian Caldwell Cook, he adopted his mother's maiden name, Batsford, in 1946. As Brian Cook, he was well known as the illustrator/designer of the dust jackets of the highly collectible Batsford books from the 1930s to the 1950s (including those in The Face of Britain series).

He was educated at Repton School, 1924-28 where he started to paint. In 1928 he began working for the production department of the publishing firm of B. T. Batsford, of which his uncle, Harry Batsford, was chairman. His first dust jacket was for The Villages of England (1932) when he was 21 years of age.  The distinctive vibrant colours of the jackets were achieved by the Jean Berté process, which used rubber plates and water-based inks. Following his uncle's death, he was chairman of Batsford, from 1952 until 1974.

As Flight Lieutenant Brian Cook he failed to defend the Conservative seat of Chelmsford at a by-election in April 1945 which was won by Ernest Millington for the short-lived Common Wealth Party. He was elected as member of parliament for Ealing South at a by-election on 12 June 1958.  He held the seat until it was abolished for the February 1974 general election, and did not stand for Parliament again.  He was knighted in 1974.
He was tenant of Lamb House, the National Trust property in Rye, East Sussex, 1980–87.

Selected bibliography
 The Britain of Brian Cook. London: Batsford, 1987.

References

External links
Index to chess books printed by Batsford Ltd

1910 births
1991 deaths
Conservative Party (UK) MPs for English constituencies
UK MPs 1955–1959
UK MPs 1959–1964
UK MPs 1964–1966
UK MPs 1966–1970
UK MPs 1970–1974
Knights Bachelor
People educated at Repton School
Politicians awarded knighthoods